3:44 is the third studio album by Polish hip-hop group Kaliber 44 released on September 2, 2000 by S.P. Records. The album was promoted with singles "Konfrontacje" and "Rutyny", having peaked at #49 on the Polish OLiS chart. 3:44 earned the Fryderyk award for Album of the Year - rap/hip-hop.

Track list 
 "Jeden" (One) -0:40
 "Takie jakie jest" (feat. WSZ & CNE) (As it is) - 3:46
 "Konfrontacje" (Confrontation) -2:36
 "Litery" (Letters) -3:01
 "Baku baku to jest skład" (feat. WSZ & CNE) (Baku baku, that's the crew) -5:37
 "Dwa" (Two) 2:58
 "Rutyny" (Routines)  3:04
 "Wena" (Afflatus) 3:25
 "Normalnie o tej porze" (Usually at this time) -4:23
 "Trzy" (Three) 1:18
 "Co robisz" (What are you doing?) 3:34
 "Masz albo myślisz o nich aż..." (You either have or think about them until...) 13:52
 "Baku baku ciężki jest jak cut" (Baku baku is heavy as a cut) 6:28
 "Cztery" (Four) 2:16

References 

2000 albums
Polish-language albums
Kaliber 44 albums